Ilir Jonuz Përnaska (born 7 May 1951) is an Albanian former footballer who played as a striker for Dinamo Tirana between 1967 and 1981, as well as the Albania national team. He is one of Dinamo's most famous players who is known for being one of the most prolific goalscorers in Albanian history, topping the domestic league's goalscoring charts in six successive seasons.

Club career
Përnaska is a product of the famous Dinamo academy and in 1967 Skënder Jareci promoted him along with Faruk Sejdini to the Dinamo first team, where at the age of just 16 he was in the usual starting eleven. On his debut in 1967 in an away match against Traktori Lushnja, Përnaska helped his side to a 3-1 win with 2 goals at the age of 16 on his professional debut.

He was part of the 'Golden Age' of Dinamo between 1971 and 1981, where under the guidance of Skënder Jareci the club dominated Albanian football winning 5 Albanian Superliga titles and 3 Albanian Cups. Përnaska formed a successful offensive partnership Vasillaq Zëri and Shyqyri Ballgjini which is considered to be the best offensive trio in Dinamo's history. He was crowned top scorer in the league for 6 consecutive seasons between 1971 and 1977, becoming the second most frequent winner of the Albanian Golden Boot, behind Partizani Tirana's Refik Resmja, although Përnaska is the player who has been top goalscorer more than any other player in history as Resmja was only joint top scorer in 1955 and 1959.

He retired from professional football in 1981 at the age of 30 after 14 years at Dinamo where he scored 136 goals and left his mark in the history of the club as well as Albanian football. Following his retirement he received a letter from Albania's Stalinist dictator Enver Hoxha along with a pair of shorts, which the player himself found to be a humourus act on the state's behalf.

International career
He made his debut for Albania in a May 1971 Olympic Games qualification match against Romania in Tirana and earned a total of 15 caps, scoring 5 goals. His final international was a September 1981 FIFA World Cup qualification match against Finland.

International goals
Scores and results list Albania's goal tally first.

Honours
Dinamo Tirana
Albanian Superliga (5): 1972–73, 1974–75, 1975–76, 1976–77, 1979–80
Albanian Cup: 1970–71, 1973–74, 1977–78
Spartakiada Kombëtare: 1959, 1969, 1974
Kupa e Ushtrisë Popullore: 1973, 1978
Kupa e 500 vjetorit të Skënderbeut: 1968

Individual
Albanian Golden Boot (6): 1971–72, 1972–73, 1973–74, 1974–75, 1975–76, 1976–77
Mjeshtër Sporti
Mjeshtër i Merituar i Sportit
Mjeshtër i Madh
Order of Naim Frashëri

Personal life
Përnaska was born in Tirana, his father Jonuz Korça was from the southern city of Korçë and his mother from the Këllezi clan in Tiranë, the last name 'Përnaska' was given to him over time. He moved to Ascoli Piceno, Italy in 1992, where he resides with his wife and 2 daughters.

References

External links

1951 births
Living people
Footballers from Tirana
Albanian footballers
Association football forwards
Albania international footballers
FK Dinamo Tirana players
Kategoria Superiore players
Albanian expatriate sportspeople in Italy